In Scots law, excambion is the exchange of land. The deed whereby this is effected is termed "Contract of Excambion".
There is an implied real warranty in this contract, so that if one portion is evicted or taken away on a superior title, the party losing the property is entitled to demand the return of the other given in exchange. Entailed lands were allowed, under certain limitations and conditions, to be exchanged by the Act 10 Geo. III. c. 51, extended by the 6 and 7 Will. IV. c. 42, and still more so by 11 and 12 Vict. c. 36, s. 5 (1848).

Alternate spellings include "excambie", "excamb", "excambiator" (an exchanger, a broker). The term is derived from Latin "excambium" (n. an exchange).

See also
Tailzie
Property law

Sources and references

 
 (entry "excamb")

External links

Scots law legal terminology